Ossirarus is an extinct genus of four-limbed stem-tetrapod from the Mississippian (mid-Tournaisian) of Scotland. It contains a single species, Ossirarus kierani, based on disarticulated skull and postcranial bones from the Ballagan Formation at Burnmouth. It would have had a large, pointed tabular horn and several minor traits shared with Devonian stem-tetrapods. Ossirarus was described in a 2016 study which was devised to fill in the tetrapod and stem-tetrapod faunas of Romer's gap, an interval of the early Carboniferous with few vertebrate fossils. It was one of five new genera named in this study, along with Aytonerpeton, Diploradus, Koilops, and Perittodus.

References 

Carboniferous tetrapods of Europe
Stegocephalians
Mississippian animals
Prehistoric tetrapod genera
Fossil taxa described in 2016